Bears Academy is a basketball club based in Aarhus, Denmark. Established in 2007, the club is an affiliate of the Bakken Bears. Since 2018, the team plays in the Basketligaen, the highest level of Danish basketball.

History
In 2007, the team was established as Elite Basketball Akademi Aarhus (EBAA). It was founded by Bakken Bears as an affiliate team to provide a link between the talent academy and the professional club.

In the 2018–19 season, EBAA would play in the Basketligaen, the highest tier of Danish basketball. This would make the team the second team from Aarhus in the league, alongside the Bakken Bears.

Players

Current roster

Season by season

References

Basketball teams established in 2007
Basketball teams in Denmark
Sport in Aarhus